Amanita galactica is a species of agaric fungus in the family Amanitaceae, first described by Giuliana Furci and Bryn Dentinger in 2020. The species was discovered in the Andes of southern Chile, living at the base of trees such as Nothofagus and Araucaria araucana. The epithet galactica was given by Furci, and was inspired by the bright white spots on the black cap that reminded her of a galaxy dotted with stars.

References

External links 
 

galactica
Fungi of South America
Fungi described in 2020